The Serbaninae are a highly modified subfamily of Pentatomidae, containing only a single known species, Serbana borneensis. It is known from very few specimens, from Malaysia and Borneo, and was originally described in the family Phloeidae, a group known only from South America, then later reclassified as a pentatomid.

References 

Invertebrates of Borneo
Pentatomidae
Insects described in 1906
Monotypic Hemiptera genera